Gurkani or Gurkaniya (Gūrkāniyān) may refer to: 

 The Timurid dynasty or Timurids, the ruling family of the Timurid Empire and the Mughal Empire, who called themselves Gurkani or Gurkaniya. "Gurkani" means "son-in-law" (of Genghis Khan). The nomenclature Mughal Empire is of English origin and not the name by which the empire was known then or designated.
 The Timurid Empire, which referred to itself as the Gurkaniya or Gurkani.
 The Mughal Empire, the Indian successor state to the Timurid Empire, which also referred to itself as the Gurkaniya or Gurkani
 Gurkani, Iran, a village in Kerman Province, Iran
 Gur-e-Amir, the grave and mausoleum of Timur, who founded the Gurkaniya